Willy David Frédéric Sagnol (born 18 March 1977) is a French professional football manager and former player who played as a defender. He is the manager of the Georgia national team.

Sagnol spent much of his professional career playing for Bayern Munich in Germany's Bundesliga. He was also part of the French squad at the 1997 FIFA World Youth Championship, 2002 FIFA World Cup, UEFA Euro 2004, 2006 FIFA World Cup and UEFA Euro 2008.

Club career
Sagnol first made his way in the world of football at his father's former club in Haute-Loire, Montfaucon-en-Velay where he developed his defensive game at right back, as well as performing exceptionally on the right side of midfield.

Saint-Étienne
From there he progressed, eventually joining the region's flagship club Saint-Étienne.

Monaco
An impressive two-year spell saw him earn a transfer to Monaco in 1997 and he experienced his first taste of success, winning Division 1 in 2000. Sagnol also played in Jean Tigana's talented Monaco team which knocked Manchester United out of the UEFA Champions League in 1998 on away goals after a 1–1 draw at Old Trafford. His excellent form saw him pressing for a call up to represent Les Bleus, but he was initially overlooked by national coach Roger Lemerre.

Bayern Munich
The summer of 2000 saw Sagnol's career take on a completely different dimension. Transferred to the prestigious German club Bayern Munich, he did not take long to break into the first team. At Bayern, Sagnol consolidated his reputation as one of the best full backs of his generation. A solid defender but also equally comfortable operating in attacking positions (often as a wing back), Sagnol's superb crossing ability marked him out as a key player in Bayern's attacking play. With the Bavarian club, he won the Bundesliga in 2001, 2003, 2005, 2006, and 2008, as well as the UEFA Champions League in 2001 and the DFB-Pokal in 2003, 2005, 2006, and 2008.

Because of continuing problems with his Achilles tendon, Sagnol quit his football career on 1 February 2009.

International career
At international level, he had less success, often finding himself on the bench playing second fiddle to Lilian Thuram on the right side of the French defence. It was not until the retirement of Marcel Desailly and Thuram's consequent move into the centre of the French defence that Sagnol finally became first-choice right back in 2004, and remained there for the next four years.

Sagnol was part of France's squad for the 2006 FIFA World Cup in Germany, starting each of his country's seven games en route to the final. His competent performances, aided by France's progression to the final led to him being named as one of the outstanding defensive performers in the tournament. He saved his best display for the biggest stage of them all, the World Cup final, and was one of the better performers in a game largely remembered for off-the-ball events rather than on-the-field performances. Indeed, Sagnol's name could have been immortalised had his strong effort on goal not been successfully repelled by Gianluigi Buffon. Nonetheless, his performance was notable for a solid defensive contribution as well as important involvement in several attacking moves, such as when he provided a cross for his captain Zinedine Zidane, whose header was again superbly saved by Buffon. Sagnol also took the final spot kick for France in the 2006 FIFA World Cup.

In the qualification campaign for Euro 2008, fans saw a completely new side of Sagnol. On several occasions, Sagnol had good efforts on goal as well as still supplying his trademark crosses for teammates like Thierry Henry against Scotland at Hampden Park on 7 October 2006. Sagnol was one of his country's better performers in France's shock loss, having an impressive three efforts on goal from his right back spot, one in particular forcing a superb save from the Scottish goalkeeper Craig Gordon. The following match, against the Faroe Islands in Paris, was his 50th for his country. His displays in that qualification campaign once more provided proof that Sagnol could be counted on for his consistent defensive play and also to provide extra quality when joining the attack.

Coaching career

Girondins de Bordeaux
Sagnol was head coach of the French U–21 team until he was appointed head coach of Girondins de Bordeaux on 23 May 2014. He signed a two–year contract which expired on 30 June 2016. Girondins de Bordeaux originally wanted Zinedine Zidane as their head coach. This was Sagnol's first coaching job at club level. In his first season, Sagnol finished sixth in Ligue 1, the 10th round of the Coupe de France, and the round of 16 in the Coupe de la Ligue. The season included a 4–1 win against Monaco, 3–2 win against Paris Saint-Germain, and a 5–0 loss to Olympique Lyonnais.

To start the 2015–16 season, Bordeaux defeated AEK Larnaca and Kairat Almaty to qualify for the group stage of the UEFA Europa League. Bordeaux started the league season with a win, four draws, and a loss. On matchday seven, on 23 September 2015, Bordeaux lost to Nice 6–1.

Sagnol was dismissed on 14 March 2016 after a 4–0 loss in the Derby de la Garonne.

Bayern Munich
On 9 June 2017, Sagnol re-joined Bayern Munich as an assistant coach under Carlo Ancelotti. Ancelotti was dismissed by the club on 28 September 2017 and Sagnol was announced as interim manager. After managing Bayern for eight days and one match (a 2–2 draw against Hertha BSC), Sagnol left the club when permanent manager Jupp Heynckes and his assistants Peter Hermann and Hermann Gerland were announced.

Personal life
He is married and has four children.

Career statistics

Club

Coaching record

Honours
Monaco
Division 1: 1999–2000
Trophée des Champions: 1997

Bayern Munich
Bundesliga: 2000–01, 2002–03, 2004–05, 2005–06, 2007–08
DFB-Pokal: 2002–03, 2004–05, 2005–06, 2007–08
DFL-Ligapokal: 2000
UEFA Champions League: 2000–01
Intercontinental Cup: 2001

France
FIFA Confederations Cup: 2001, 2003
FIFA World Cup runner-up: 2006

References

External links

1977 births
Living people
Footballers from Saint-Étienne
2001 FIFA Confederations Cup players
2002 FIFA World Cup players
2003 FIFA Confederations Cup players
2006 FIFA World Cup players
AS Monaco FC players
AS Saint-Étienne players
FC Bayern Munich footballers
FC Bayern Munich II players
Expatriate football managers in Germany
Expatriate footballers in Germany
Bundesliga players
France international footballers
French expatriate footballers
French expatriate sportspeople in Germany
French footballers
Ligue 1 players
UEFA Euro 2004 players
UEFA Euro 2008 players
FIFA Confederations Cup-winning players
France youth international footballers
French football managers
FC Girondins de Bordeaux managers
France national under-21 football team managers
FC Bayern Munich managers
Bundesliga managers
Association football defenders
UEFA Champions League winning players
French expatriate sportspeople in Monaco
Expatriate footballers in Monaco